The Spirit Catches You and You Fall Down: A Hmong Child, Her American Doctors, and the Collision of Two Cultures is a 1997 book by Anne Fadiman that chronicles the struggles of a Hmong refugee family from Houaysouy, Sainyabuli Province, Laos, the Lees, and their interactions with the health care system in Merced, California. In 2005 Robert Entenmann, of St. Olaf College wrote that the book is "certainly the most widely read book on the Hmong experience in America."

On the most basic level, the book tells the story of the family's second youngest and favored daughter, Lia Lee, who was diagnosed with a severe form of epilepsy named Lennox-Gastaut Syndrome, and the cultural conflict that obstructs her treatment.

Through miscommunications about medical dosages and parental refusal to give certain medicines due to mistrust, misunderstandings, and behavioral side effects, and the inability of the doctors to develop more empathy with the traditional Hmong lifestyle or try to learn more about the Hmong culture, Lia's condition worsens. The dichotomy between the Hmong's perceived spiritual factors and the Americans' perceived scientific factors comprises the overall theme of the book.

The book is written in a distinctive style, with every other chapter returning to Lia's story and the chapters in between discussing broader themes of Hmong culture, customs, and history; American involvement in and responsibility for the war in Laos; and the many problems of immigration, especially assimilation and discrimination. While particularly sympathetic to the Hmong, Fadiman presents the situation from the perspectives of both the doctors and the family. An example of medical anthropology, the book has been cited by medical journals and lecturers as an argument for greater cultural competence, and is often assigned to medical, pharmaceutic, and anthropological students in the US. In 1997, it won the National Book Critics Circle Award for General Nonfiction.

Major characters

Lia Lee (Romanized Popular Alphabet: Liab Lis, July 19, 1982 – August 31, 2012.): a Hmong child born in Merced, California, in 1982. Beginning in infancy, Lia experiences severe seizures due to Lennox–Gastaut syndrome, a rare form of epilepsy.

Anne Fadiman: author and narrator of The Spirit Catches You and You Fall Down, writing about her experience with Lia and her family. Throughout the story, she stresses the importance of cultural competence in the doctor-patient relationship (and in the greater medical establishment).

Neil Ernst and Peggy Philp: Lia’s primary care doctors at MCMC. Throughout the story, they clash with Lia's parents, whose adherence to Hmong shamanism conflicts deeply with their own beliefs about Western medicine. Despite the good intentions of Ernst, Philp, and Lia's parents, significant miscommunication and disagreement cause Lia permanent harm.

Foua Yang and Nao Kao Lee: Lia’s parents, who believe fervently in the traditional Hmong approach to medicine.

Jeanine Hilt: a social worker who makes Lia her personal cause and fights on Lia’s behalf. She is presented as one of the few members of the American medical establishment willing to acknowledge Hmong tradition and tailor treatment to Lia's case.

Summary

Lia experienced her first seizure at three months of age, but a resident at Merced Community Medical Center misdiagnosed her condition, and the hospital was unable to communicate with her parents since the hospital had no Hmong interpreters. Anne Fadiman wrote that Lia's parents did not give her medication as it was prescribed because they believed that Lia Lee's state showed a sense of spiritual giftedness, and they did not want to take that away. The American doctors did not understand the Hmong traditional remedies that the Lee family used. The doctors treating Lia Lee, Neil and Peggy Ernst, had her removed from her home when she was almost three years of age, and placed into foster care for one year, causing friction with her parents. By age 4½ Lia Lee had been admitted to hospital care 17 times and had made over 100 outpatient visits.

The worst seizure Lia had put her on the verge of death. She went to the emergency room and Dr. Neil Ernst could not do anything. He talked to Lia's parents about transferring her to Fresno, California because Lia would need further treatment that Ernst could not provide.  Lia's parents believed their daughter was transferred because of Ernsts' vacation plans.

Lia Lee slipped into a coma after suffering from a tonic-clonic seizure in 1986 when she was four years of age. Lia Lee's doctors believed she would die, but Lia Lee remained alive but with no higher brain functions.

Research

Fadiman's sources for information about the history of the Hmong include Hmong: History of a People by Keith Quincy. She stated "Were I citing the source of each detail, Quincy's name would attach itself to nearly every sentence in the pages on the Hmong in China." Fadiman's book cited the Quincy theory that the Hmong people originated from Siberia. Entenmann wrote that because of the reliance on Quincy's book, Fadiman's book propagates the idea that Sonom was a Hmong king, a concept that Entenmann says is inaccurate.

Legacy
Marilyn Mochel, a nurse and clinical educator at Sutter Merced Medical Center (now Mercy Medical Center Merced), who heads the hospital's cross-cultural program, said in 1999 that "The book has allowed more dialogue. There's certainly more awareness and dialogue than before. Both sides are teachers and learners."

Lia Lee lived in a persistent vegetative state for 26 years. She died in Sacramento, California, on August 31, 2012, at the age of 30. Outside of the State of California Lia Lee's death was not widely reported. Fadiman said that pneumonia was the immediate cause of death. Margalit Fox of The New York Times said "[b]ut Lia’s underlying medical issues were more complex still" because she had lived in a persistent vegetative state for such a long period of time. As of 2012 most individuals who go into that state die three to five years afterwards.

In 2019, The Spirit Catches You and You Fall Down was ranked by Slate as one of the 50 greatest nonfiction works of the past 25 years.

Reception
Ralph Jennings of The Modesto Bee said "Hmong, including some among the 2,000 in Modesto, say the book typified conflicts between their culture and American institutions. But some say it didn't capture the complexity of the Hmong culture."

Cheng Lee, a brother of Lia Lee, said that his father and mother liked Fadiman's book.

“Compellingly written, from the heart and from the trenches. I couldn’t wait to finish it, then reread it and ponder it again. It is a powerful case study of a medical tragedy.” - David H. Mark, Journal of the American Medical Association

Anne Fadiman's essay "Hmong Odyssey", adapted from the book, was published in the March–April 1998 Via. The Hmong community leaders in Fresno, California, praised the essay, saying that it was thoughtful and accurate.

See also

 History of the Hmong in Merced, California

Notes

External sources
 - Google Books citations lead to September 30, 1998 edition published by Macmillan, 9781429931113.
New England Journal of Medicine article 1 
 Fox, Renée C., Ph.D. "Cultural Competence and the Culture of Medicine." New England Journal of Medicine. 2005; 353:1316-1319. September 29, 2005. DOI: 10.1056/NEJMp058066
New England Journal of Medicine article 2 
 Malina, Debra, Ph.D. "Compliance, Caricature, and Culturally Aware Care." New England Journal of Medicine. 2005; 353:1317-1318. September 29, 2005. DOI: 10.1056/NEJMp058064.

External links
The Spirit Catches You and You Fall Down at Macmillan Publishing
"Ann Fadiman: 'Go to the Edge of Your Culture'."  Inside Chico State. Volume 32, Number 4. October 25, 2001
Yang, Yeng. "Practicing Modern Medicine: "A little medicine, a little neeb"." (." (Archive) Hmong Studies Journal. v2n2. northern hemisphere Spring 1998.
Ernst, Neil T. and Margaret "Peggy" Philp. "Bacterial Tracheitis Caused By Branhamella Catarrhalis." Pediatric Infectious Disease Journal. June 1987. Volume 6, Issue 6. Page 574.
Lilly, Amy. "Influential Author Discusses How Culture Clash Became Tragedy." Seven Days. February 17, 2010.
Lammert, Kathy. "When Epilepsy Goes By Another Name." Epilepsy.com. September 15, 2003.
Chrismer, Ellen. "Fadiman visit stirs emotions, understanding." University of California-Davis. December 6, 2002.
Chiu, Monica (University of New Hampshire). "Medical, Racist, and Colonial Constructions of Power: Creating the Asian American Patient and the Cultural Citizen in Anne Fadiman’s The Spirit Catches You and You Fall Down"  (Archive). Hmong Studies Journal 2004-05, Volume 5.

1997 non-fiction books
Epilepsy
Hmong-American culture in California
Hmong-American culture and history
Medical anthropology
Anthropology books
Anthropology of religion
National Book Critics Circle Award-winning works
Books about spirituality
Books about California
Merced, California